"You Should Probably Leave" is a song recorded by American singer-songwriter Chris Stapleton, it was released on May 17, 2021, as the second single from his fourth studio album Starting Over. The song was co-written by Ashley Gorley, Chris DuBois and Stapleton, who also produced the track with Dave Cobb.

No official music video was made for the song.

Background
The song had been written back in 2014. In a clip from October 2014, Stapleton was seen performing in Nashville on a simple stage, and his wife Morgane joined in.

Content
"You Should Probably Leave" describes a story about an on-again, off-again couple who cannot seem to keep themselves from coming back to one another, even though they know their story will not end well.

Critical reception
The song won the Best Country Solo Performance Grammy Award in 2022.

Charts

Weekly charts

Year-end charts

Certifications

References

2021 singles
2021 songs
Chris Stapleton songs
Songs written by Ashley Gorley
Songs written by Chris Stapleton
Songs written by Chris DuBois
Song recordings produced by Dave Cobb
Mercury Nashville singles